Trajan was a  74-gun ship of the line of the French Navy.

Career 

At the Bourbon Restoration in 1814, she returned to Brest, where she was decommissioned. In 1822 she was found to be in need of a refit, and was struck  in 1827. Trajan was eventually broken up in 1829.

Citations and references

Citations

References

Winfield, Rif & Stephen S Roberts (2015) French Warships in the Age of Sail 1786 - 1861: Design Construction, Careers and Fates. (Seaforth Publishing). 

Ships of the line of the French Navy
Téméraire-class ships of the line
1811 ships